Živojin Mišić  (19 July 1855 – 20 January 1921) was a Field Marshal who participated in all of Serbia's wars from 1876 to 1918. He directly commanded the First Serbian army in the Battle of Kolubara and in breach of the Thessaloniki Front was the Chief of the Supreme Command. He is the most decorated Serbian military officer in history.

Early years
Mišić's grandfather was born in Struganik near Mionica. His parents Radovan and Anđelija (born Damjanović - Koštunjić) had thirteen children.
Živojin was the youngest child, and when he was born, only eight of his brothers and sisters were still alive. When he turned 6, he became a shepherd. He finished primary school in Kragujevac. In his memories, he mentions troubles he had with the city kids that teased him because of his peasant origin. In 1868, he started his gymnasium education in Kragujevac, where he finished the 1st, 2nd, and 6th grade. He finished the third and fourth grade in Belgrade. In the first five gymnasium grades he was not a particularly good student, but he finished the 6th grade with much greater success. Because of that, he was admitted to the Military Academy in 1874, ranked 19th. On every holiday he visited his village, and often he worked in the field with his brothers. Later, on 25 November 1884, he married a German woman, Louise Krikner (1865-1956), at Ascension Church in Belgrade, and they had six children, three sons and three daughters.

He participated with distinction in the Serbo-Turkish wars of 1876 and 1878 with the rank of lieutenant JG of the infantry and in the Serbo-Bulgarian War of 1885 as a full lieutenant - a company commander in the 5th infantry regiment of Drinska division.

Sometime after the assassination of King Aleksandar Obrenović (see May Overthrow), he was forced to retire, supposedly through the influence of the "Black Hand" as he was considered too close to the Obrenović dynasty, but was reactivated on the personal insistence of the Chief of Staff of the High command of the Serbian Army, General Radomir Putnik who made him his aide.

Military career

In the Balkan wars Mišić was the assistant chief of staff of the Supreme Command of vojvode Radomir Putnik, his right-hand man.
After the Battle of Kumanovo of the First Balkan War, he was promoted to General. During the critical moments of the Bulgarian surprise offensive at the Battle of Bregalnica of the Second Balkan War, when most of the staff suggested that the Serbian army should withdraw to the second line of defence, Mišić (still the Aide of the Chief of Staff) strongly disagreed and persuaded Putnik to order the army to repel the attack on the first line, thus contributing greatly to the Serbian victory in the battle.

During the July Crisis of 1914 Mišić effectively deputised for the ailing Putnik (then recuperating at a spa in Hungary). Defending against the Austro-Hungarian invasion of Serbia, Mišić (who had emerged from retirement to do so) was placed in command of the Serbian First Army; in December 1914, he won a decisive victory at the Battle of Kolubara that resulted in the humiliating expulsion of Austro-Hungarian forces from Serbia. He was subsequently promoted to the rank of Field Marshal in recognition of his efforts in winning such a sweeping Serbian victory.

Although Mišić participated in the great retreat of the Serbian Army through the winter mountains of Albania during the winter of 1915–16, harried by the second combined German and Austro-Hungarian invasion force (ultimately joined by Bulgaria), he remained in favour of halting and making a final stand against Serbia's combined enemies.  He was over-ridden however by both King Peter and the other Army commanders at a meeting in Peć, and was followed by the withdrawal of the Serbian army through Montenegro and Albania.

Having suffered badly from exposure during the epic retreat, Mišić recovered.
At the Thessaloniki front in 1916, Mišić commanded the First Army, which stopped and forced the withdrawal of the Bulgarian army at the Battle of Gornicevo. Towards the end of the war in June 1918 Mišić was appointed Chief of the Supreme Command and commanded the Serbian army during the breakthrough of the Salonika front in September 1918.
He was a lecturer at the Military Academy in Belgrade, and the end of his military career was greeted in 1918 with appointment as the Chief of General Staff of Army of The Kingdom of Serbs, Croats and Slovenes.

Memoirs

During his hospitalization in France prior to his death Mišić began writing his memoirs, titled Moje uspomene ("My memories" in English). He managed to cover his entire life up to the start of the Second Balkan War but died before he could cover it and the First World War.

In his book, the famous general did not hesitate to present the reality of life in Serbia and the harsh parts of participating in war; the reality of the Serbian Army, which had mostly inexperienced peasants; and the problems Serbian peasants had at beginning of the second half of the 19th century with new laws about land peasants owned and the beginning of political life in Serbia. Notable in Mišić's book was his observation of how contemporary Serbs were naive and overly idealistic: "As the Russian lancer squadron moved into a battle, I noticed how our people are naive, since we all believed that that squadron will make miracles up on hills fighting Turks, and that we will succeed in pushing Turks out from battle. But the Russian squadron soon broke apart and they went in some other direction."

Death
Mišić died in a Belgrade hospital of lung cancer in 1921.

Legacy
He is included in The 100 most prominent Serbs.

Decorations

See also
 Petar Bojović
 Radomir Putnik
 Stepa Stepanović
 Božidar Janković
 Ilija Gojković
 Pavle Jurišić Šturm
 Ivan S. Pavlović

References

Sources

External links

 

1855 births
1921 deaths
People from Mionica
People from the Principality of Serbia
Serbian soldiers
People of the Serbo-Bulgarian War
Serbian people of World War I
Serbian military personnel of World War I
Serbian military personnel of the Balkan Wars
Field marshals
Honorary Knights Grand Cross of the Order of St Michael and St George
Honorary Knights Commander of the Order of the Bath
Royal Serbian Army soldiers
Recipients of the Distinguished Service Medal (US Army)
Recipients of the Croix de Guerre 1914–1918 (France)
Recipients of the Legion of Honour
Recipients of the Order of the Cross of Takovo
Foreign recipients of the Distinguished Service Medal (United States)
Burials at Belgrade New Cemetery